Iga Świątek defeated Maria Sakkari in the final, 6–4, 6–1 to win the women's singles tennis title at the 2022 Indian Wells Masters. She became the first Pole to win the title.

Paula Badosa was the defending champion, but lost to Sakkari in the semifinals.

The international governing bodies of tennis (WTA, ATP, ITF, Australian Open, French Open, Wimbledon, US Open) allowed players from Russia and Belarus to continue to participate in tennis events on tour and at the Grand Slams, but not under the name or flag of Russia or Belarus until further notice, due to the 2022 Russian invasion of Ukraine.

Seeds
All seeds received a bye into the second round.

Draw

Finals

Top half

Section 1

Section 2

Section 3

Section 4

Bottom half

Section 5

Section 6

Section 7

Section 8

Seeded players
The following are the seeded players. Seedings are based on WTA rankings as of February 28, 2022. Rankings and points before are as of March 7, 2022.

Like the men's event, points from the 2021 tournament will not drop until October 17, 2022 because it was held in October 2021. Instead of defending points from the 2021 tournament, each player's 16th best result will be replaced by their points from the 2022 tournament.

Withdrawn players
The following players would have been seeded, but withdrew before the tournament began.

Other entry information

Wildcards

Source:

Qualifiers

Lucky losers

Withdrawals

Qualifying

Seeds

Qualifiers

Lucky losers

Qualifying draw

First qualifier

Second qualifier

Third qualifier

Fourth qualifier

Fifth qualifier

Sixth qualifier

Seventh qualifier

Eighth qualifier

Ninth qualifier

Tenth qualifier

Eleventh qualifier

Twelfth qualifier

References

External links
 Main draw
 Qualifying draw

BNP Paribas Open - Singles
Singles women